Back2Basics is an Irish radio show on the Irish state broadcaster RTÉ. It airs on RTÉ Pulse, the dedicated electronic dance music station  every Wednesday 11pm - midnight, live on DAB digital radio (where available), the RTÉ Player, the RTÉ Radio Player, the UPC cable service (channel 493), and nationally via the free-to-air Saorview TV service (channel 205) and online via the internet.

The show was previously broadcast using only vinyl records. It went fully digital in January, 2019.

In June 2019 the show was chosen the be part of the Mixcloud Select programme.

The show is presented by Simon Palmer.

References

RTÉ Pulse's homepage

RTÉ Digital Radio